Gambarini is a surname. Notable people with the surname include:

Elisabetta de Gambarini (1730–1765), English composer, pianist, conductor, and painter
Roberta Gambarini (born 1965), Italian jazz singer
Giuseppe Gambarini (1680–1725), Italian painter

Italian-language surnames